Association Française de Normalisation (AFNOR, English: French Standardization Association) is a Paris-based standards organization and a member body for France at the International Organization for Standardization (ISO).

The AFNOR Group develops its international standardization activities, information provision, certification and training through a network of key partners in France who are members of the association. They are:

 ACTIA (Association of Technical Cooperation for the food industry)
 ADEME (French Agency for Environment and Energy Management)
 ADEPT (Association for the development of international trade in food products and techniques)
 COFRAC (French Accreditation Committee)
 CSTB (Scientific and Technical Center for Construction)
 CTI (Center Network industrial technology)
 INERIS (National Institute for Industrial Environment and Risks) emerged from CERCHAR (Study and research centre of the Charbonnages de France) and IRCHA (National research institute of applied chemistry) 
 LCIE (Laboratoire Central des Industries Électriques)
 LNE (Laboratoire National Metrology and Testing)
 UTAC (Union Technique de l'automobile, cycle and motorcycle)
 UTE (Union Technique de l'Électricité)

See also
 International Organization for Standardization
 Countries in the International Organization for Standardization
 ISO country code

Examples of norms 
 ARCADIA

References

External links 
 

France
Business organizations based in France
Organizations based in Paris
Organizations with year of establishment missing